Jalalia is a town in Abbottabad District of Khyber Pakhtunkhwa province of Pakistan. It is located at 34°8'45N 73°6'10E  with an altitude of 919 metres (3018 feet).

References

Populated places in Abbottabad District